Shahri may refer to:
 Shahri, Hormozgan, a village in Iran
 Shahri, Mazandaran, a village in Iran
 Golshahr, Sistan and Baluchestan, also known as Shahri, a village in Iran

See also 
 Shahri language of Oman
 Shehri (disambiguation)